Leonard Norris Foster (born February 2, 1951 in Covington, Kentucky) is a former Major League Baseball infielder.

Foster had one of the more unfortunate debuts in Major League history, when playing his first game for the Braves against the Pittsburgh Pirates at Three Rivers Stadium on July 9, 1971. Fielding at shortstop, he commits an error on the first ball hit to him. After flying out in the 3rd inning, Foster hits into a double play in the 5th inning, followed by hitting into a triple play in the 7th inning.

Sources

External links

The Baseball Gauge
Pura Pelota : VPBL batting statistics
Retrosheet

1951 births
Living people
African-American baseball players
Arizona Instructional League Braves players
Atlanta Braves players
Baseball players from Kentucky
Greenwood Braves players
Leones del Caracas players
American expatriate baseball players in Venezuela
Major League Baseball infielders
New York Mets players
Pawtucket Red Sox players
Sportspeople from Covington, Kentucky
Puerto Rico Boricuas players
Richmond Braves players
Savannah Indians players
Shreveport Braves players
Tidewater Tides players
21st-century African-American people
20th-century African-American sportspeople